Mărăcineni is a commune in Argeș County, Muntenia, Romania. It is composed of two villages, Argeșelu and Mărăcineni. In the past, Argeșelu was named Ciumești.

The commune is located in the center of Argeș County, just north of the county seat, Pitești.

Natives
 Nicoleta Dascălu

References

Communes in Argeș County
Localities in Muntenia